is a music video game for the Wii. It was created by PaRappa Rappa designer Masaya Matsuura and artist Rodney Greenblat.

Major Minor’s Majestic March uses the Wii Remote as a mace (a form of baton used exclusively by drum majors) that the drum major, Major Minor, uses to keep tempo, recruit new band members and pick up valuable items. While marching through eight whimsical locations that contain various hair-raising events, Major Minor strives to create the most impressive parade ever. Players can add up to 15 different instruments to their dynamic procession—including brass, woodwinds, and percussion—to alter its composition and resulting performance. Players are then scored on how well their band maintains its rhythm and manages obstacles that could otherwise throw the procession into disarray. The band keeps tempo to more than 25 popular marching band songs from around the world, composed into original medleys for each stage.

John Merchant, marketing manager of Majesco Europe has been quoted saying about this game: "There’s something magical about marching bands that truly captures the imagination. The concept of leading a virtual band that’s reliant on your musicianship is a perfect fit for the interactive capabilities of Wii. The combined musical and artistic superiority of Matsuura and Greenblat make them a natural choice to deliver this innovative title exclusively to the Wii audience".

Reception
Major Minor's Majestic March sold poorly in Japan at only 600 copies in its first two days, failing to enter the Media Create top fifty for its week of release. The game received a "B" from tech-gaming.com. Issue number 202 of Edge Magazine scored the game 3 out of 10. Reviews on the Run gave the game 0.0 from Jose "Fubar" Sanchez, and 0.5 from Victor Lucas, two of the lowest scores possible, with the main complaints from both being that "the damn controls don't work!" Nintendo Power gave it a 6.0. According to Game Informer's Matt Helgeson, who gave the game a 3.0 out of a possible 10: "If I'm going to spend a long period of time with my hand wrapped around an oblong object, moving my arm rapidly up and down, it sure won't be with this game".

Rodney Greenblat, who created the art style for the game, shared his disappointment: "No, I was not happy about MMMM.  Pretty much everything went wrong. I could write a book about the compounded mistakes made by hardworking and talented people".

References

External links
Official website 
Majesco Press Release
Game Art by Rodney Greenblat

2009 video games
Majesco Entertainment games
Marching bands
Music video games
NanaOn-Sha games
Single-player video games
Square Enix games
Video games developed in Japan
Wii games
Wii-only games